Bosch is a small lunar impact crater near the North Pole of the Moon. It is located just to the northeast of the Rozhdestvenskiy crater.

This crater was previously unnamed until it was given a name by the IAU along with 18 other craters on January 22, 2009. It was named after German chemist and Nobel Prize winner Carl Bosch (c. 1874 – c. 1940).

References

Impact craters on the Moon